Acarospora janae is a species of lichen in the Acarosporaceae family. Described as new to science in 2011, it is known only from New Mexico and Colorado in the United States, where it grows on siliceous rock.

Taxonomy
The lichen was first described scientifically in a 2011 issue of the journal Phytotaxa, one of 100 new species authored by 102 contributors from 35 countries. The type collection was made in Las Vegas (San Miguel County, New Mexico) in 1927 by Arsène Brouard. The specific epithet janae refers to Jana Kocourkova, colleague and fiancée of the species author Kerry Knudsen.

Description
The lichen thallus (body) consists of dispersed areoles (a small rounded area that is more or less polygonal or angular, and delimited by cracks) that are dark to light brown in color. The surface of the areoles often have fine grooves. The disc of the lichen (a round, plate-like spore-producing part of the fruit body) has a rough texture and is either the same color as the thallus or darker. It sometimes has umbos and ridges, but these tend to disappear as the disc fully dilates.  The hymenium is about 100 μm thick and contain paraphyses that have a diameter of 2 μm. The asci (spore-bearing cells) are club-shaped, measure 60 by 20 μm, and contain roughly 100 spores. The spores are 3–4 by 2 μm.

Habitat and distribution
Acarospora janae grows on siliceous rock. It is known only from the type locality, and a modern collection made from Marks Creek Township, Wake County, North Carolina, although Knudsen suggests that it may occur infrequently from Utah and the Colorado Plateau south into Mexico.

References

Lichens described in 2011
Lichen species
Lichens of the South-Central United States
janae
Fungi without expected TNC conservation status
Lichens of the Northwestern United States